Irind is a village in the Talin Municipality of the Aragatsotn Province of Armenia located about 30 km east of the Turkish border. Irind was founded in 1921 by survivors of the Armenian genocide who had fled from Mush and Sasun. The town contains a 7th-century octagonal church that in 2011 was being reconstructed.

Notable residents of Irind 
Avetis Isahakyan - Armenian poet, writer, and academic lived in Irind for 5 years
Khachik Dashtents - Armenian writer, poet, and translator
Prime Minister of Armenia Andranik Margaryan's family

References 

Report of the results of the 2001 Armenian Census
Kiesling, Rediscovering Armenia, p. 18, available online at the US embassy to Armenia's website

Populated places in Aragatsotn Province